Asteromonas is a genus of green algae in the family Asteromonadaceae.

References

External links

Chlamydomonadales
Chlamydomonadales genera